Derby Road railway station (also known as Derby Road (Ipswich)) is on the Felixstowe Branch Line in the east of England, serving the Rose Hill area and southern area of California on the eastern side of the town of Ipswich, Suffolk.

The station was opened by the Felixstowe Railway & Pier Company in 1877 and takes its name from the street on which it is located in Ipswich. It used to be a popular station for people travelling from the eastern side of Ipswich to the seaside at Felixstowe due to its connection to the local tram system.

History
The Act of Parliament for the Felixstowe Railway and Pier was granted on 19 July 1875. It was soon built and opened, along with the station at "Derby Road (Ipswich)", on 1 May 1877. The Suffolk Chronicle described its location as "the most inconvenient and out-of-the way spot which could have been selected" and during the line's pre-opening inspection by the Board of Trade, the mayor of Ipswich unsuccessfully made representations for an additional station a half-mile to the north between Spring Road and Woodbridge Road.

On 1 September 1879 the Great Eastern Railway took over operation of the line, although the original Felixstowe company retained ownership until  5 July 1887, when it sold the railway to the GER. In October 1879 the "Ipswich" suffix was dropped from the station name and some trains now continued beyond Westerfield to the main Ipswich station. This allowed better connections with trains on the main line, but that station, like Derby Road, was outside the commercial centre of the town.

They could reach the station on the Ipswich Tramway which terminated outside the entrance. Consequently, many trains from Felixstowe turned around here instead of continuing to Ipswich. The station was rebuilt with a second platform in 1891.

An accelerated diesel-powered service was introduced to the branch on 15 June 1959. In 1967 the branch was converted to "Pay Train" operation, with all fares being collected by the guard so that no staff were needed at the stations other than a signalman. By the end of that year, passenger trains no longer continued beyond Felixstowe Town but that part of the line was retained for a few freight services to Felixstowe docks, which had just started to handle shipping containers.

By 1986 there were 12 to 13 container trains passing through Derby Road in each direction to and from Felixstowe. These lengthy trains could not pass at Derby Road as the loop was too short, and the large number of these trains was causing disruption to the passenger service which was running less frequently than in the past. To resolve these issues the loop was extended in 1999. At the same time the signal box was closed and control of the line transferred to Colchester Panel Signal Box.

The Derby Road bridge over the railway was rebuilt in 2003 to take the higher containers from Felixstowe docks.

Description
When the station opened it had a single platform on the north side of the line (despite the town centre being on the other side). Sidings on both side of the line were accessed from the Felixstowe-end of the station; a two-arch bridge carried the road over the line at the other end. A passing loop was added in 1891 which allowed another platform to be added on the south side of the line where a signal box was situated. More sidings were added over the years, including ones serving coal merchants and a scrap yard.

Today both platforms are still in use. The station offices on the eastbound platform are still standing but unused; on the westbound platform there is a waiting shelter.

Services

When the railway opened in 1877 there were six trains to and from Felixstowe and four to and from Westerfield. By 1939 this had increased to 20 Felixstowe services, most of which continued through to Ipswich. In 1973 this had been reduced to just 13 trains each way, all of which now ran through to Ipswich.

 the typical Monday-Saturday off-peak service at Derby Road is as follows:

The line also carries substantial freight traffic to and from the port of Felixstowe operated by Freightliner, DB Cargo and GB Railfreight but there are no sidings nowadays at Derby Road.

References

Railway stations in Suffolk
DfT Category F2 stations
Railway stations in Great Britain opened in 1877
Former Great Eastern Railway stations
Greater Anglia franchise railway stations